Buffalo River State Park was an Arkansas state park, established in 1938, that was absorbed into Buffalo National River when the Federal park was established in 1972. The area is now known as Buffalo Point. The new state park was developed with Civilian Conservation Corps labor in 1939 with the construction of park structures to plans from the National Park Service Branch of Plans and Designs. The CCC structures now comprise a historic district on the National Register of Historic Places.

One park highlight is a 3-mile trail.  The Indian Rockhouse Trail is wonderfully scenic with many great points of interest including sculpted bedrock, a waterfall, a former zinc mine, and the Indian Rockhouse Cave.

See also
Big Buffalo Valley Historic District
Rush Historic District
Parker-Hickman Farm Historic District
National Register of Historic Places listings in Marion County, Arkansas

References

Parks on the National Register of Historic Places in Arkansas
State parks of Arkansas
1939 establishments in Arkansas
Rustic architecture in Arkansas
Civilian Conservation Corps in Arkansas
Geography of Marion County, Arkansas
State parks of the U.S. Interior Highlands
National Register of Historic Places in Marion County, Arkansas
National Register of Historic Places in Buffalo National River